Beiyangjing Road is a station on Line 6 of the Shanghai Metro. It began services on December 29, 2007. There are two side platforms, and the station's main color is blue. There are three exits, all of which are on Zhangyang Road.

Bus routes
169, 339, 630, 638, 736, 773, 783, 783 alt, 790, 791, 935, 961, 975

References 

Railway stations in Shanghai
Shanghai Metro stations in Pudong
Railway stations in China opened in 2007
Line 6, Shanghai Metro